Trading with the enemy may refer to

Trading with the enemy, a legal term
Trading with the Enemy, a music album

See also
Trading with the Enemy Act